The 1915–16 Williams Ephs men's ice hockey season was the 13th season of play for the program.

Season

Roster

† Munchler and Michler were alternatively reported as playing goal for Williams, however, no one with either name appears to have attended Williams at the time.

Standings

Schedule and Results

|-
!colspan=12 style=";" | Regular Season

References

Williams Ephs men's ice hockey seasons
Williams
Williams
Williams
Williams